Paul Calvin Vogt (born December 16, 1964) is an American actor and comedian, best known for his work as a cast member on the sketch comedy programs Mad TV, The Big Gay Sketch Show, and The Rerun Show.

Life and career
Paul C. Vogt was born in Buffalo, New York.  He graduated from Kenmore East High School in 1982. Most famous for appearing on TV and film in Mad TV, episodes of Arrested Development, Reno 911!, Hannah Montana, and Maximum Bob, and the films The Princess Diaries 2: Royal Engagement and Valentine's Day.

Vogt has guest starred on Chicago Hope, Hannah Montana, In-Laws, Grey's Anatomy, and Glee. He was a regular cast member of the NBC summer series The Rerun Show. He has also starred in several commercials, independent films, and stage work. He also acted as Jimbo Milachi in Happy Days, a musical based on the hit television series by Garry Marshall at the Falcon Theater in Burbank. He also appeared in Marshall's film Raising Helen.

In January 2007, he took over the lead role of Edna Turnblad in the Broadway production of Hairspray (the role created by Divine in the John Waters film and then by Tony winner Harvey Fierstein on Broadway).  Previously, he played the role in the Las Vegas production (succeeding Harvey Fierstein) in May 2006, as well as the regional theatre premiere at the North Shore Music Theatre (Beverly, Massachusetts) in the fall of 2006.  He appeared in the movie Blonde Ambition, filming his scenes in between Hairspray performances. Paul voiced the character Buzz Offmann in the 2008 animated film Igor.

In August 2008, he reprised his role as Edna Turnblad in Hairspray for 12 performances at the Sacramento Music Circus. He also reprised the role in August 2009 at The Muny.

In 2011, appeared as Ursula in the summer production of The Little Mermaid at The Muny in St. Louis.

In January 2013, he once again reprised his role as Edna Turnblad with the Indianapolis Symphony Orchestra's production of Hairspray in Concert.  The concert also played the Baltimore Symphony Orchestra the same month. He went on to appear in Hairspray Live! playing Harriman F. Spritzer, broadcast on December 7, 2016.

In 2019, Vogt joined the cast of Perfect Harmony on NBC.

Mad TV

Vogt joined the cast of Mad TV during the eighth season as a featured player, then was promoted to repertory status the following.  He created characters such as flamboyant Lillian Verner Game Show host Dale Briskett and Angela Wright's Canadian cousin Natalie. His celebrity impersonations included Charlotte Rae (a reprisal of Mrs. Edna Garrett from The Rerun Show), Dick Cheney, James Lipton, and Richard Simmons.  He left the TV show because he had an out in his contract after three years. Vogt is the second cast member (after Nelson Ascencio) to have a twin sibling appear with each other in a sketch in the show. Vogt was also the only known openly gay cast member.

Characters
 2-Litre Beth (Fantanas)
 Cynthia "Cindy" Delmont (Big Lady), a plus-sized woman who is oblivious to being discriminated against due to her size.
 Dale Briskett (Lillian Verner Game Show)
 Ernie "Ernest" (The B.S.)
 Harvey Muckenthaler (Stuart Larkin)
 Carlton "Carl" Swanson, Sr. (Lorraine Swanson)
 Natalie Wright
 Nurse (7:00 AM Condo Report)
 Officer Rufus Champagne, a police officer who keeps getting attacked by midgets.
 Sister Mary (Coach Hines)

Celebrity impressions 

 Ben Franklin
 Bert Lahr (as the Cowardly Lion on The Wizard of Oz)
 Bruce Vilanch
 Camryn Manheim
 Charlotte Rae 
 David White (as Larry Tate in Bewitched)
 Diana DeGarmo
 Dick Cheney
 Ed Asner
 Ethan Suplee
 Franklin Cover (as Tom Willis on The Jeffersons)
 Jackie Gleason
 James Lipton
 Jeff Garlin
 Jorge Garcia
 Kevin James
 Kirstie Alley
 Les Moonves
 Michael Moloney
 Michael Moore
 Melissa McCarthy
 Queen Elizabeth II
 René Angélil
 Richard Simmons
 Steve Harwell
 Thom Filicia
 Tom Poston
 Willard Scott

Personal life
Vogt was diagnosed with non-Hodgkin's lymphoma in 2013. As of April 2015, Vogt is now a stage 4 lymphoma survivor and is in recovery.

Filmography
 1987: My Dark Lady as Tweedle Dee
 1997: Kenan & Kel as Waiter
 1998: Maximum Bob as Bogart Crowe
 1999: The First of May as Tom (or Hank)
 1999: The Blair Clown Project as Fisherman
 2000: Chicago Hope as Earl Pepper
 2000: Five Wishes as Big Guy #2
 2002: The Rerun Show as Various
 2002: In-Laws as Bruce Sherman
 2002–05: Mad TV as Various
 2003: Spanish Fly as Brick's Manager #1
 2003: An American Reunion as Big Will Grunger
 2003: Good Boy! as Bob the Dog Catcher
 2003–05: Reno 911! as Paintball Sniper
 2004: The Princess Diaries 2: Royal Engagement as Lord Crawley
 2005: Lilo & Stitch 2: Stitch Has a Glitch as Gator Guard
 2005: Arrested Development as Twin #1
 2006–08: Hannah Montana as Mr. Dontzig
 2007: Blonde Ambition as Floyd
 2008: The Big Gay Sketch Show as Various
 2008: Happy Wednesday as Handsy Agent
 2008: Igor as Buzz Offmann
 2008: Precious Meadows as Brad Bolhuis
 2009: Rise and Fall of Tuck Johnson as Oliver Bone
 2010: Grey's Anatomy as Aaron Mafrici
 2010: Valentine's Day as Shouting Sheldon
 2010: Glee as Herb Duncan
 2011: Kung Fu Panda: Secrets of the Masters as Pig Announcer
 2012: Pack of Wolves as The Thin Man
 2013: Raising Hope as Saul
 2016: Mother's Day as Tiny
 2016: Hairspray Live! as Mr. Harriman F. Spritzer
 2017: The Orville as Horbalak Captain

References

External links

1964 births
Living people
21st-century American comedians
American male comedians
American impressionists (entertainers)
American male musical theatre actors
American male stage actors
American male television actors
Identical twin male actors
Male actors from Buffalo, New York
Gay comedians
American twins
American sketch comedians
Comedians from New York (state)
American gay actors
American LGBT comedians